The Governor of Kaliningrad Oblast (Губернатор Калининградской области) is the head of executive branch for the Kaliningrad Oblast (former Königsberg, East Prussia), considered as Prime Minister of Kaliningrad Oblast.

The office of Governor is an elected position, for which elected officials serve four year terms. While individual politicians may serve as many terms as they can be elected to, Governors cannot be elected to more than two consecutive terms.

The official residence for the Governor is located in Kaliningrad. The current Governor is Anton Alikhanov, who assumed office on 6 October 2016.

Chairmen of the Kaliningrad Oblast Executive Committee (1947–91)
Since the creation of Kaliningrad Oblast in 1946 and until the spring of 1990, the Kaliningrad Regional Committee of the Communist Party had the leading role in its government. The committee was led by:
 Vasily Borisov (May 1947 – April 1948)
 Alexey Yegorov (April 1948 – December 1951)
 Zakhar Slaykovsky (December 1951 – May 1962)
 Yakov Prushinsky (May 1962 – March 1966)
 Vladimir Vitkovsky (May 1966 – May 1983)
 Vasily Loginov (June 1983 – April 1987)
 Yuri Malinkin (April 1987 – September 1991)

List of governors

Timeline

Elections
The latest election for the office was held on 10 September 2017

External links
Government of Kaliningrad Oblast  in Russian

 
Politics of Kaliningrad Oblast
Kaliningrad Oblast